Captain 3rd rank is a rank used by the Russian Navy and a number of former communist state. The rank is the lowest rank in the staff officer's career group. The rank is equivalent to Major in armies and air forces. Within NATO forces, the rank is rated as OF-3 and is equivalent to Lieutenant commander in English speaking navies.

Russia

 Captain 1st rank
 Captain 2nd rank
 Captain 3rd rank

Captain 3rd rank insignia

See also 
 History of Russian military ranks
 Ranks and rank insignia of the Russian armed forces until 1917
 Ranks and rank insignia of the Red Army 1918–1935, ... 1935–1940 and ... 1940–1943
 Ranks and rank insignia of the Soviet Army 1943–1955 and Ranks and rank insignia of the Soviet Army 1955–1991,
Ranks and rank insignia of the Russian Federation´s armed forces 1994–2010
 Naval ranks and insignia of the Russian Federation

References

Military ranks
Military ranks of Russia
Military ranks of the Soviet Union
Military ranks of Ukraine